Buckner is a surname. Notable people with the surname include:

Bill Buckner (1949–2019), American baseball first baseman and outfielder
Billy Buckner (born 1983), American baseball pitcher
Brentson Buckner, former National Football League player
Charles Buckner, ( 1735–1811) admiral in the British Royal Navy
Dave Buckner, drummer of Papa Roach
DeForest Buckner (born 1994), American football player
Derek Buckner, 21st-century New York painter
George Washington Buckner (1855-1943), American physician and diplomat
Jack Buckner, British track athlete
John Buckner (bishop), LL.D. (1734–1824), Bishop of Chichester, England 
Lena Northern Buckner (1875-1939), American social worker
M. M. Buckner, science-fiction author
Milt Buckner, (10 July 1915 – 27 July 1977), American jazz pianist and organist
Mordecai Buckner ( 1735–1787), American Continental Army officer
Randy Buckner, American neuroscientist
Richard Buckner (1812–1883), English portraitist
Richard Buckner, American singer-songwriter
Robert Buckner (1906-1989), American writer and film producer
Simon Bolivar Buckner, Confederate general during the American Civil War
Simon Bolivar Buckner Jr., American general during World War II
Susan Buckner, actress who played Patty Simcox in Grease
Thomas Buckner, (1941- ), New York baritone
Thomas Buckner, English athlete
William Buckner (1605-1657), Archdeacon of Salisbury, England
William Buckner (?-1700), Member of the Irish Parliament for Dungarvan